Manuel "Lolo" Sainz Márquez (born August 28, 1940) is a Spanish retired professional basketball player and coach. Sainz spent most of his career with Real Madrid, either as a player, or a head coach. He did however, also coach the senior Spain national team, between 1993 and 2001. On 3 February 2008, he was chosen as one of the 50 Greatest EuroLeague Contributors, over the previous half-century, by the EuroLeague Basketball Experts Committee.

Playing career

Clubs
As a player with Real Madrid, Sainz won 4 FIBA European Champions Cup (now called EuroLeague) titles (1964, 1965, 1967, 1968).

Spanish senior national team
As a player, Sainz was a member of the senior Spain national basketball team. With Spain, he played at the EuroBasket 1961, the 1963 EuroBasket, and the 1965 EuroBasket.

Coaching career

Clubs
As a head coach with Real Madrid, Sainz won 2 FIBA European Champions Cup (now called EuroLeague) titles (1978, 1980). He was the AEEB Spanish Coach of the Year in 1977, 1985, and 1991.

National team career
Sainz was also the head coach of the senior Spanish national team, between 1993 and 2001. He led Spain to a silver medal at the 1999 EuroBasket.

See also 
 List of EuroLeague-winning head coaches

References

External links 
FIBA Player Profile
FIBA Europe Player Profile
Real Madrid Profile

1940 births
Living people
EuroLeague-winning coaches
Joventut Badalona coaches
People from Tétouan
Point guards
Real Madrid basketball coaches
Real Madrid Baloncesto players
Shooting guards
Spanish basketball coaches
Spanish men's basketball players
Spanish Olympic coaches